The 38th Ryder Cup was held 1–4 October 2010 at the Celtic Manor Resort in Newport, Wales. It was the 17th time the Ryder Cup had been staged in Britain, but the first time in Wales. It was played on the newly constructed Twenty Ten course, specifically designed for the event. The team captains were Colin Montgomerie for Europe and Corey Pavin for the United States.

With the U.S. as the defending champion, Europe won by a score of 14 to 13 and regained the Cup. It was Europe's sixth victory in the last eight contests and their fourth consecutive home win. The event was plagued by bad weather with play having to be suspended twice. Having taken a 3-point lead into the singles matches Europe faced a U.S. fightback and the conclusion of the Ryder Cup 2010 went right down to the anchor match between Graeme McDowell and Hunter Mahan. Eventually McDowell defeated Mahan 3 & 1 to regain the Cup for Europe.

The competition was officially opened by Carwyn Jones, First Minister for Wales.

Format
The Ryder Cup is a match play event, with each match worth one point. The original schedule in 2010 was:

Day 1 (Friday) – 4 four-ball (better ball) matches in a morning session and 4 foursome (alternate shot) matches in an afternoon session
Day 2 (Saturday) – 4 four-ball matches in a morning session and 4 foursome matches in an afternoon session
Day 3 (Sunday) – 12 singles matches

With a total of 28 points, 14 points are required to win the Cup, and 14 points are required for the defending champion to retain the Cup.  All matches were played to a maximum of 18 holes.

It was the second time in succession that the schedule for four-ball (better ball) and foursome (alternate shot) matches on Day One and Day Two has been changed, i.e. it was scheduled to be effectively the same timetable as was used in 2006.

Revised format

As a result of the long suspension of play on the first day due to heavy rain, the format for the rest of the competition was changed to try to bring a conclusion to the matches on Sunday. However, further heavy rain caused a delayed start on Sunday, so that the last of the revised sessions would be played on Monday. Because of the changes, there were a number of Ryder Cup firsts. For the first time in the history of the Ryder Cup, all 24 players took part in pairing sessions at the same time in six pairings (as opposed to the usual four pairings) and in another first for the event both foursome and four-ball matches were played in the same session at the same time. It is also the first time that the competition went into a fourth day. The revised schedule consisted of four sessions as opposed to the usual five.
 
Session One (Friday and Saturday) – 4 four-ball (better ball) matches
Session Two (Saturday) – 6 foursome (alternate shot) matches
Session Three (Saturday and Sunday) – 2 foursome and 4 four-ball matches
Session Four (Monday) – 12 singles matches

The total number of each type of match remained the same, 8 four-ball, 8 foursomes, and 12 singles. By captains' agreement, matches would conclude at sundown Monday if not completed before then. Any matches still in progress would be considered halved at that point.

Television
The matches were covered live domestically on Sky Sports with daily highlights shown on the BBC.

All matches were covered live in the United States, a first for a Ryder Cup in Europe. ESPN handled Friday coverage. Mike Tirico and Paul Azinger hosted from the 18th tower, with Curtis Strange, Peter Alliss, and Sean McDonough calling holes, and on-course reporters Andy North, Billy Kratzert and Judy Rankin. Scott Van Pelt and Tom Weiskopf handled recaps during coverage. Most of ESPN's coverage was rained out on Friday, with a 7-hour rain delay during the middle of the day. NBC Sports covered the weekend action, with Dan Hicks and Johnny Miller hosting from the 18th tower, Gary Koch calling holes, and on-course reporters Mark Rolfing, Roger Maltbie, and Dottie Pepper. USA Network aired coverage of the singles live on Monday morning. The coverage was produced by corporate sibling NBC, with NBC's announcers being used on the telecast.

Team qualification and selection

Europe
The European team consisted of:
 The top four players on the Ryder Cup World Points List
Total points earned in Official World Golf Ranking events from 3 September 2009 to 22 August 2010, and thereafter only in the 2010 Johnnie Walker Championship at Gleneagles.
 The five players, not qualified above, on the Ryder Cup European Points List
Money earned in official European Tour events from 3 September 2009 to 29 August 2010
 Three captain's picks
The captain's picks were named on 29 August. In the previous the Ryder Cup had been two wildcard places on the European team, but on 12 May 2009 it was announced that this had been increased to three.

There was much discussion about the qualification process after leading players based primarily in the United States, such as Paul Casey and Justin Rose, failed to make the team. As a result, the priority of the European and World lists was switched for the 2012 Ryder Cup.

Final points standings

Players in qualifying places (Q) are shown in green; captain's picks (P) are shown in yellow; those in italics (q) qualified through the other points list.

United States
The United States team consisted of:
 The top eight players on the Ryder Cup Points List
Points gained from money earned in majors in 2009 and official PGA tour events in 2010 up to 15 August (i.e. up to and including money earned at the 2010 PGA Championship). Money earned in 2010 majors counted double and money earned in 2010 events played opposite the majors or World Golf Championships counted half.
 Four captain's picks

The team was finalised on 7 September when the four wildcards were announced.

Final points standings

Players in the qualifying places (Q) are shown in green. Captains picks (P) are shown in yellow.

Teams

Captains
The team captains were Colin Montgomerie for Europe and Corey Pavin for the USA.

Vice-captains
Each captain selected a number of vice-captains to assist him during the tournament and to advise the players on the course.

The European vice-captains were Thomas Bjørn, Darren Clarke, Sergio García, Paul McGinley and José María Olazábal. Olazábal was added as a fifth vice-captain during the tournament, when the revised format meant that there were not enough vice-captains to cover all six matches simultaneously.

The USA vice-captains were Paul Goydos, Tom Lehman, Davis Love III and Jeff Sluman.

Players

Captains picks are shown in yellow; the world rankings and records are at the start of the 2010 Ryder Cup. Peter Hanson celebrated his 33rd birthday on the final day.

Captains picks are shown in yellow; the world rankings and records are at the start of the 2010 Ryder Cup.

Session 1 (Friday and Saturday)

Four-ball

Four-balls play on Friday began on schedule but was suspended at 9:43 am BST due to poor course conditions because of rain. Play was resumed at 5:00 pm as the water had drained off the course but was suspended again for the day just after 7 pm BST. Play was completed Saturday morning.

Session 2 (Saturday)

Foursomes

In order to fit the intended number of matches into a schedule that had been condensed due to the weather, three sessions of four matches each were converted into 2 sessions of 6 matches each, requiring all 24 players to play during Sessions 2 and 3.

Session 3 (Saturday and Sunday)

Foursomes

Four-ball

Play began in the third session on late Saturday afternoon. Team Europe was leading all six matches when darkness halted play. Start of play on Sunday was delayed until 13:20, due to severe weather overnight leaving running water on the fairways again.

Session 4 (Monday)
For the first time in Ryder Cup history, the final session was conducted on a Monday, due to torrential rain on the first day which delayed the schedule.

Singles

Individual player records
Each entry refers to the win–loss–half record of the player.

Source:

Europe

United States

Opening concert

A concert, dubbed 'Welcome to Wales', was held at the Millennium Stadium in Cardiff on 29 September 2010, two days prior to the beginning of the Ryder Cup. The event replaced a planned traditional gala dinner and was introduced by celebrities and golf stars. The concert featured musical performances by international superstars, and was hosted by Steve Jones.

The concert was headlined by Lostprophets, with Shirley Bassey, Katherine Jenkins, Catherine Zeta-Jones and Only Men Aloud! also featuring in the 90-minute televised event. The European and US golfers appeared on stage to greet the audience. It marked Bassey's first appearance in Wales for over 5 years.

Awards
In December 2010, BBC Sport named the Europe squad "Team of The Year".

References

External links

Celtic Manor Resort: Twenty Ten Course

Ryder Cup
Golf tournaments in Wales
Events in Newport, Wales
Sport in Newport, Wales
Ryder Cup
Ryder Cup
Ryder Cup